"More Than Words" (モアザンワーズ) is the 21st single from Maaya Sakamoto. It was released by FlyingDog on July 25, 2012.

Overview 
The title song "More Than Words" was used as the theme song for animated series, Code Geass: Akito the Exiled. As a single, Yuho Iwasato and Yoko Kanno tag together since "tune the rainbow".

After this work, the jacket design was handled by Yutaka Kimura.

It asw released in two editions, a first press limited edition and a regular edition. At first glance, the jacket and PV seem to be synthesized, but in reality they are all analog without using synthesis. For example, there are two Sakamotos in the preview, but this is just to make it look like there are two people of the same person.

The total number of shipments is 16,000.

Reception 
Tetsuo Hiraga of Billboard JAPAN and HotShotDiscs described it as "pop music as a work of art that makes you realize that you are alive by facing reality instead of lining up easy-to-understand positive words."

Recorded songs 
(All composition and arrangement: Yoko Kanno)
 'More Than Words' [5:08]
 Lyricist: Yuho Iwasato
 According to Sakamoto, "a song with a unique world view that cannot be explained in words", it was actually ordered by Kazuki Akane, the director of Code Geass: Akito the Exiled. However, the demo was created by Sugano and was finished as a ballad. She also said that when she sang, the orchestra was heavy and had a sense of depth, so she tried to keep it simple.
 "Isn't freedom painful?", which appears in the lyrics, came up when she had a private conversation with Iwasato a few years ago, and she asked Sakamoto to sing it until the day came. She also said that, until now, she had written lyrics to the melody, but this time she asked her to put in more than the melody. Therefore, Sakamoto, Kanno, and Iwasato took a method of thinking about phrases. Upon its completion, Akane praised it as "very good".
 Deco-Boko March (The formation follows you) [5:00]
 Lyricist: Maaya Sakamoto
 Tree Climbing and Red Skirt ‐Live Version‐ [5:51]
 Lyricist: Yuho Iwasato
 Secret track
 "Live 2011 in the silence" @ Tennozu Galaxy Theater, Tokyo
 DVD (first limited edition only)
 more than words (music clip)

Footnotes

External links 
 Introductory page by Flying Dog
 First Press Limited Edition
 Regular Edition
 special site

Maaya Sakamoto songs
2012 songs
Music in anime and manga